The red-faced crombec (Sylvietta whytii) is a species of African warbler, formerly placed in the family Sylviidae.
It is found in Burundi, Ethiopia, Kenya, Malawi, Mozambique, Namibia, Rwanda, South Sudan, Tanzania, Uganda, and Zimbabwe.
Its natural habitats are subtropical or tropical dry forests, subtropical or tropical moist montane forests, and subtropical or tropical dry shrubland.

References

External links
 Red-faced crombec  - Species text in The Atlas of Southern African Birds.

red-faced crombec
Birds of East Africa
red-faced crombec
red-faced crombec
Taxonomy articles created by Polbot